Ali Sara (also Romanized as ‘Alī Sarā) is a village in Ahmadsargurab Rural District, Ahmadsargurab District, Shaft County, Gilan Province, Iran. At the 2006 census, its population was 952, in 232 families.

References 

Populated places in Shaft County